Gordon Rhind Oak Crole-Rees (17 November 1883 – 9 June 1954) was a British tennis player.

Career

Crole-Rees was educated at Highgate School from September 1905 until April 1911.

Davis Cup
Crole-Rees made his Davis Cup debut in 1925 when he was used by Great Britain for two singles rubbers against France at Devonshire Park. For the rest of Davis Cup career, a further nine ties, he featured only in the doubles. Initially he partnered Charles Kingsley and then he played alongside Cyril Eames.

Wimbledon
Crole-Rees twice reached the third round at the Wimbledon Championships, but had more success at the tournament as a doubles player. He made the quarter-finals in the men's doubles in three successive years from 1926 to 1928. In the 1927 Wimbledon Championships, en route to the quarter-finals, Crole-Rees and his partner Cyril Eames managed to defeat second seeds Jean Borotra and Rene Lacoste. He made semi-finals in the mixed doubles with Phyllis Mudford at the 1930 Wimbledon Championships.

Singles titles
1925: Surrey Championships
1926: Kent Championships
1927: Surrey Championships
1927: Irish Lawn Tennis Championships

See also
List of Great Britain Davis Cup team representatives

References

External links
 
 
 

1883 births
1954 deaths
People educated at Highgate School
English male tennis players
British male tennis players
Tennis people from Essex
19th-century British people
20th-century British people